Central City, also known as Eta, is an unincorporated community in Coffee County, Alabama, United States.

History
The community is likely named for its location. A post office operated under the name Eta from 1894 to 1903.

References

Unincorporated communities in Coffee County, Alabama
Unincorporated communities in Alabama